Zetor (since January 1, 2007, officially Zetor Tractors a.s.) is a Czech agricultural machinery manufacturer. It was founded in 1946. The company is based in Brno, Czech Republic. Since June 29, 2002, the only shareholder has been a Slovak company, HTC Holdings. The company manufactures tractors and tractor components (engines or transmissions).

Zetor was the first manufacturer to develop and produce tractor safety cabins. In its 70-year history, Zetor has sold over 1.3 million tractors.

Abroad, Zetor is represented through seven affiliations in North America, the United Kingdom, France, Germany, Poland, Slovakia and India. In 2015, 86% of total production of the company headed to foreign countries. In addition to traditional markets such as Poland, Czech Republic, Slovakia and Germany, its products are also exported to the UK, France, Ireland and Lithuania.

Name 
The name Zetor, which was later to become the name of the brand and which was used by the state Company to mark the tractors, was created by Rostislav Sapák, a member of the Czech Economic Department, in spring 1946. The name is formed of the syllable Zet (the spelling of the letter Z in the alphabet, the first letter of the name of the Arms Factory “Zbrojovka”) and the suffix –or from the word tractor. It also relates to the phrase "farming tractor" in Czech: "ZEmědělský trakTOR" (other cryptonyms for the name are also possible).

History 

The history of Zetor starts in 1946 when the first tractor was produced by Zbrojovka Brno, branded Zetor 25. The Zetor trademark was registered in the same year, and mass production of Zetor tractors started on 7 August 1946. By 1947, about 3400 had been produced. In 1948, the Zetor 15 was approved for production, and it was manufactured until 1949. The Zetor 25A and 25K were manufactured until 1961 and 158,570 were produced, of which 97,000 were exported. The Zetor 35, with a  four-cylinder engine, was manufactured from 1955 to 1960 and then, as the upgraded Zetor 50 version, until 1968.

In 1952, Zetor moved to a new location within Brno, Líšeň, where all tractors have since been produced.

In the late 1950s, ZETOR was the first to introduce the concept of using unified parts to produce tractors worldwide. The Unified Series I (UŘ I.) was launched, with the models 2011, 3011 and 4011, with two, three and four-cylinder engines. In 1968, the Unified Series II (UŘ II) was launched. It included many innovative features for the time, e.g. the world's first safety cabin with rollover protection system, mounted on vibration isolators. The new cabin also helped to reduce noise in the cabin to below 85 dB. Thanks to these innovative procedures, the Zetor brand was globally acclaimed and topped the charts of global tractor manufacturers.

In the 1970s, the first six-cylinder Zetor Crystal 12011 tractor was designed. In 1976, Zetor became the name of both the brand and the company. The company continued to evolve and, in 1991, the Unified Series III was launched. It was upgraded at the turn of the millennium and was branded the Zetor Forterra.

In 1994, the 7320 Turbo and 7340 Turbo models extended the range. In 1997, the production of models 3321 super-7341 super turbo was launched, badged Model 97.

The turn of the millennium was a period of significant change for the Zetor brand. It could have disappeared, because the state-owned enterprise faced bankruptcy. In June 2002, HTC Holdings of Slovakia became the owner of Zetor. The new owners invested money to stabilise and restructure the enterprise.

Current models 
Zetor produces six tractor model ranges: Zetor Utilix, Zetor Hortus, Zetor Major, Zetor Proxima, Zetor Forterra, and Zetor Crystal.

Utilix and Hortus 
The new Utilix and Hortus lineups were introduced in the first quarter of 2018.

Zetor Major 
Zetor Major range was launched in the early 2002. In late 2016, the company launched new Major HS, which offered higher comfort while retaining low operation costs. Tractors of the Major range included in the medium-power class are appreciated for easy operation and service.

Zetor Proxima 
The Proxima range entered the market in 2004. It is a universal farming tractor employing Zetor four-cylinder engines. They could be used in conjunction with farming machines, industrial adaptors and in farming transport. They were mostly used in farming, forestry and community service. They also offered creeper gears in the CL model, up to three-stage PowerShift or PowerShuttle.

Zetor Forterra 
The Forterra range introduced robust tractors equipped with four-cylinder Zetor engines, which were suitable for heavy-duty work in farming and forestry. The first models entered the market in 2008. In 2012, the range was extended by the Forterra HSX, with 30/30 transmission and electro-hydraulic reverser.

Zetor Crystal 
For a long time, Zetor did not produce a powerful six-cylinder tractor. One was launched in 2015, when the unveiling of the Zetor Crystal. The name "Crystal" refers to the legendary tractors produced by Zetor from 1969 to the 1980s. In that period, over 45,000 Crystal tractors were sold. The engines were had 24 valves and common-rail fuel injection. The transmission offered 30 forward and 30 reverse gears. The operation of the tractor was made easier by three-stage PowerShift, PowerShuttle and PowerClutch, with the clutch button incorporated into the gear-shifting lever.

Branding of Zetor tractors 
The Unified Series used new coding. The first or three numbers of the marking of the tractor related to the approximate power of the engine in horsepower, e.g. 72, 80, 121, 162, etc. The next two numbers denoted powered axles, e.g. 7211 (Zetor with approximate power of  without front-wheel drive).
45 (Zetor with 4WD)
16 (Semi-caterpillar version)

Zetor by Pininfarina 
In 2015, at the Agritechnica exhibition in Hanover, Zetor introduced the design concept "Zetor by Pininfarina". The concept was applied to all products and model ranges of the Zetor brand. The BBC said of the Italian Pininfarina studio design that it is the most sexy tractor in the world.

Other services

Engines and components
Zetor also produces and sells individual engines and tractor components. Four-cylinder Zetor engines meet required emission standards, including the currently strictest Stage IV. It offers service and spare parts, which are supplied throughout the world. The Zetor stock currently includes over 20,000 original parts for all types of Zetor tractors, ranging from Unified Series I, II, and III, to current models. Thus, even tractors aged over 40 years have full service support. Zetor also produces original oils under the Zetor brand.

Front loaders
Zetor offers two ranges of front-end loader within the Zetor System. Front-end loaders marked ZL and ZX differ in size and lifting force, with both being compatible with all current Zetor tractors.

Zetor Gallery
13 June 2013 saw the ceremonial opening of the Zetor museum, called Zetor Gallery. The museum displayed tractors from the legendary Z25 up to the most current Crystal model, as well as the prototype of the forthcoming "Zetor by Pininfarina" tractors. Part of the museum is also a fan shop.

Notes

References

External links

Zetor official website

Tractor manufacturers of the Czech Republic
Companies based in Brno
Czech brands
Manufacturing companies established in 1946